This is a list of marine fish pursued by recreational anglers.

 Archosargus probatocephalus
 Arripis trutta
 Barcheek trevally
 Striped bass
 Black-banded trevally
 Bludger (fish)
 Hardhead catfish
 Centropomus parallelus
 Cero (fish)
 Cocinero
 Common dentex
 Doublespotted queenfish
 Black drum
 Elops saurus
 Galjoen
 Gilt-head bream
 Greater amberjack
 Black grouper
 Tiger grouper
 Hyporthodus nigritus
 Yellowfin grouper
 Bar jack
 Cottonmouth jack
 Longfin crevalle jack
 Pacific crevalle jack
 Green jack
 Horse-eye jack
 Threadfin jack
 Yellow jack
 Leerfish
 Cape horse mackerel
 Greenback horse mackerel
 Japanese jack mackerel
 Mediterranean horse mackerel
 Pacific jack mackerel
 King mackerel
 Atlantic Spanish mackerel
 Mycteroperca interstitialis
 Orange-spotted trevally
 Permit (fish)
 Polysteganus praeorbitalis
 Pomadasys commersonnii
 African pompano
 Florida pompano
 Jolthead porgy
 Rainbow runner
 Red porgy
 Samson fish
 Torpedo scad
 Scomberoides commersonnianus
 Scomberoides tol
 West coast seabream
 Selene brevoortii
 Smallmouth scad
 Australasian snapper
 Common snook
 African threadfish
 Indian threadfish
 Trachinotus africanus
 Blacktip trevally
 Blue trevally
 Bluefin trevally
 Bluespotted trevally
 Brassy trevally
 Brownback trevally
 Bumpnose trevally
 Cleftbelly trevally
 Coastal trevally
 Imposter trevally
 Island trevally
 Longfin trevally
 Longnose trevally
 Longrakered trevally
 Malabar trevally
 Shadow trevally
 Tille trevally
 Bigeye trevally
 Whitefin trevally
 Yellowspotted trevally
 Giant trevally
 Coachwhip trevally
 Wahoo
 Yellowtail scad

See also
Game fish
List of freshwater game fish

References

 Game
 Marine
Game, Marine